Esporte Clube Guarani, commonly referred to as Guarani de Venâncio Aires, is a Brazilian football club based in Venâncio Aires, Rio Grande do Sul. It currently plays in Campeonato Gaúcho Série A2, the second level of the Rio Grande do Sul state football league.

History
Found 3 September 1929 as Sociedade de Foot-Ball Sport Club Guarany.

Recent results

References

Football clubs in Rio Grande do Sul
Association football clubs established in 1929
1929 establishments in Brazil